Amir Khosrow Afshar (1919–1999) was an Iranian diplomat, who served as the minister of foreign affairs of Iran during the Shah era from 1978 to 1979.

Biography
Born in 1919 in Tehran, Afshar was a career diplomat. At the beginning of the 1950s he was the political joint secretary at the foreign ministry. He later assumed the posts of the permanent secretary at the Ministry of Foreign Affairs and deputy foreign minister. In 1960, he was the acting minister of foreign affairs.

While serving as the deputy to Ardeshir Zahedi, Iranian foreign minister, Afshar was named as the chief Iranian negotiator on the Bahrain question in 1968. Next, he was appointed ambassador of Iran to the Court of St James's on 6 November 1969, succeeding Abbas Aram in the post. He held this position until December 1974 when he was replaced by Muhammad Reza Amir Teymour in the post.

Afshar also served as the ambassador of Iran to West Germany and to France. He was appointed foreign minister to the cabinet led by Jafar Sharif-Emami on 27 August 1978, replacing Abbas Ali Khalatbari in the post. He retained the post when a military government led by Gholam Reza Azhari was formed on 6 November 1978. His term ended in January 1979, and Ahmad Mirfendereski replaced him in the post.

In the 1960s Afshar was among the Iranian statesmen who favored Iran's close relations with the U.S. and other Western countries in order to secure the survival of the Pahlavi dynasty. He left Iran before the revolution in 1979 and died in 1999.

Honors
Afshar was the recipient of Honorary Knight Commander of the Most Distinguished Order of Saint Michael and Saint George.

References

External links

20th-century Iranian diplomats
20th-century Iranian politicians
1919 births
1999 deaths
Ambassadors of Iran to Germany
Ambassadors of Iran to France
Ambassadors of Iran to the United Kingdom
Foreign ministers of Iran
Honorary Knights Commander of the Order of St Michael and St George
Politicians from Tehran